Hob or Hobs may refer to:

Businesses and organizations 
 Heart of Brooklyn, a tourism-related non-profit organization in New York City
 HOB GmbH & Co KG, an international computer company
 Hobs Reprographics, a British printer
 Hemne Orkladal Billag, a defunct Norwegian transport company
 House of Blues, a chain of music halls and restaurants

People 
 Hob Broun (1950–1987), American author
 Hob Bryan (born 1952), American politician
 Hob Hiller (1893–1956), American Major League Baseball player

Fictional characters 
 Hob Gadling, in The Sandman comic book series by Neil Gaiman
 Hob, a robot-like creature in the webcomic Dresden Codak
 Hob, in RoboCop 2

Codes 
 hob, ISO 639-3 code for the Mari language (Madang Province) of Papua New Guinea
 HOB, station code for Hoboken Terminal, New Jersey, United States
 HOB, IATA code for Lea County Regional Airport, New Mexico, United States
 HOB, UK code for HM Prison High Down, Surrey

Other uses 
 Gear hob, a tool used in gear-making
 A male ferret
 A stake used as a target in the game of quoits
 Hob (folklore), a household spirit in Northern England, see also Hobgoblin
 Hob or Old Hob, a nickname for the Devil
 Hob (hearth), a projection, shelf, grate or bench for holding food or utensils
 Cooktop, the top cooking surface on a kitchen stove
 Hob (unit), a Korean unit of volume equal to about 180 ml
 Hob (video game), an action-adventure game
 Hoboken-Verzeichnis, abbreviated "Hob.", the catalogue of the compositions of Joseph Haydn
 Hob, 2004 debut album of Egyptian singer Tamer Hosny
 House Office Building, where members of the United States House of Representatives work
 A nail on the sole of a hobnailed boot
 House of Balloons, the first mixtape of the Trilogy by The Weeknd

See also

 
 
 Hobb (disambiguation)
 Hobbe (disambiguation)
 Hobbes (disambiguation)
 Hobbs (disambiguation)